Synod of the Northeast is an upper judicatory of the Presbyterian Church (USA) based in East Syracuse, New York. The synod oversees twenty-two presbyteries in six New England states (Maine, New Hampshire, Vermont, Massachusetts, Rhode Island, and Connecticut), two of the three Mid-Atlantic States (New Jersey and New York), plus a non-geographical Korean Presbytery.

History
The Synod of the Northeast was founded in May 1973, when the General Assembly decided to reorganize its synods on a regional basis. The merger included the following state synods:
 The Synod of New Jersey was established in 1824, when the Presbytery of Jersey was divided into the presbyteries of Newark and Elizabeth Town.
 The Synod of New York
 Synod of New England

Presbyteries of the Synod of the Northeast
There are 22 presbyteries in the synod:
 Presbytery of Albany
 Presbytery of Boston
 Presbytery of Cayuga-Syracuse
 Eastern Korean American Presbytery
 Presbytery of Elizabeth
 Presbytery of Genesee Valley
 Presbytery of Geneva
 Presbytery of Hudson River
 Presbytery of Long Island
 Presbytery of Monmouth
 Presbytery of New Brunswick
 Presbytery of New York City
 Presbytery of Newark
 Presbytery of Newton
 Presbytery of Northern New England
 Presbytery of Northern New York
 Presbytery of the Palisades
 Presbytery of Southern New England
 Presbytery of Susquehanna Valley
 Presbytery of Utica
 Presbytery of West Jersey
 Presbytery of Western New York

References

External links
 Synod website
 Map of synod

 
Presbyterianism in the United States
History of Connecticut
History of Maine
History of Massachusetts
History of New Hampshire
History of New Jersey
History of New York (state)
History of Rhode Island
History of Vermont
Presbyterian synods